The Macedonians in Montenegro form a small minority in the country. The last official census showed that there are 900 Macedonians in Montenegro. According to the Macedonian associations in Montenegro there are about 2000 Macedonians living in Montenegro.

History of the Macedonians in Montenegro 
By 1948, 133 Macedonians lived in Montenegro, this number rose to 875 in 1981. 1,072 Macedonians were counted in the 1991 Yugoslav Census, this number had fallen to 819 by 2003. Macedonian was the mother language of 507 people. The Macedonians were concentrated in Podgorica, Herceg Novi and Tivat. There is an estimated 2,500 Macedonians in Montenegro today.

Organizations 
The two main organizations of the Macedonians in Montenegro are the Association of Montenegrin-Macedonian Friendship and the National Community of Macedonians in Montenegro, which was established in 2006.

The National Community of Macedonians aims to make the Macedonian language more popular in Montenegro and to help Macedonians integrate better into the Montenegrin system and market.

See also  
 Montenegro–North Macedonia relations

References

Ethnic groups in Montenegro
Montenegro
Montenegro–North Macedonia relations